Kuha Mo! is a 2019 Philippine documentary and news magazine television program broadcast by ABS-CBN, anchored by Anthony Taberna. It premiered on the network's Yes Weekend Saturday afternoon block from April 27, 2019 to July 25, 2020 and airs worldwide on The Filipino Channel, replacing DocuCentral Presents.

Overview 
Kuha Mo! is the latest addition to ABS-CBN Integrated News' informative and advocacy-driven programming that aims to raise public awareness of stories and issues caught on camera. Hosted by Anthony Taberna, one of ABS-CBN's proactive personalities, Kuha Mo! does not stop with just featuring the story of our case studies but extends to help individuals who may need assistance or support regarding their situation.

Production notes 
On November 16, 2019, Kuha Mo! was pre-empted to give way to the airing of UAAP Season 82 Men's Basketball Finals on ABS-CBN.

On March 21 to May 2, 2020, Kuha Mo! was temporarily suspended when the program suspended production of its new episodes due to the enhanced community quarantine in Luzon caused by the COVID-19 pandemic and ABS-CBN stopped its free-to-air broadcast operations as ordered by the National Telecommunications Commission (NTC) due to the lapsing of the network's legislative franchise. As a result, the program released new episodes through its social media accounts.

Kuha Mo! returned on-air via pay television network Kapamilya Channel from June 13 to July 25, 2020. Its reruns ended after Anthony Taberna transferred to All TV and DZRH.

Accolades

References

External links
 
 

ABS-CBN original programming
ABS-CBN News and Current Affairs shows
Philippine documentary television series
2019 Philippine television series debuts
2020 Philippine television series endings
Filipino-language television shows